Simetsberg (elevation ) is a mountain in the Bavarian Prealps of southern Germany. An isolated peak, it forms the eastern end of the Ester Mountains.

References

Mountains of Bavaria
Bavarian Prealps
Mountains of the Alps